Trempealeau County is a county in the U.S. state of Wisconsin. As of the 2020 census, the population was 30,760. Its county seat is Whitehall. Many people of Polish, Norwegian and German descent live in this area.

History
Patches of woodland are all that remain of the brush and light forest that once covered the county. In ancient times, the woodlands contained a great deal of timber, but Native Americans burned them periodically to encourage the growth of berries. They did little cultivation and had been almost completely removed from the area by 1837.

French fur traders were the first Europeans to enter this land, traveling by river across the county. At the mouth of the Trempealeau River at its confluence with the Mississippi River, they found a bluff surrounded by water and called it La Montagne qui trempe à l’eau ("mountain steeped in water"). It is now known as Trempealeau Mountain. The name was later shortened to Trempealeau. Created in 1854 and organized in 1855, the county is named after the river.

During the 19th and 20th century large numbers of Norwegian immigrants settled in the area in pursuit of cheap land, a better life and more opportunities. Much of the population is still of Norwegian descent and celebrate their ancestry by making foods native to Norway and participating in Norwegian Constitution Day events.

In the late 1850s, Trempealeau became a destination for Polish Prussian settlers from Upper Silesia seeking to escape German persecution and poverty in their homeland. They built churches, schools, and communities to develop what became the nation's second-largest Polish settlement. Their settlements were especially focused around Independence, Arcadia, Whitehall, and Pine Creek. Trempealeau has a large population of Silesian Polish descent to this day.

The county again became an immigrant destination in the first decades of the 21st century, gaining a significant Hispanic and Latino population.

Geography
It is part of the Driftless Zone.

Adjacent counties
 Buffalo County - west
 Eau Claire County - north
 Jackson County - east
 La Crosse County - southeast
 Winona County, Minnesota - southwest

Major highways

Railroads
BNSF
Canadian National

Buses
List of intercity bus stops in Wisconsin

National protected areas
 Trempealeau National Wildlife Refuge (part)
 Upper Mississippi River National Wildlife and Fish Refuge (part)

Demographics

2020 census
As of the census of 2020, the population was 30,760. The racial makeup of the county was 85.5% White, 1.2% Native American, 0.4% Asian, 0.3% Black or African American, 7.9% from other races, and 4.7% from two or more races. Ethnically, the population was 12.9% Hispanic or Latino of any race.

2000 census
As of the census of 2000, there were 27,010 people, 10,747 households, and 7,243 families residing in the county. There were 11,482 housing units at an average density of 16 per square mile (6/km2). The racial makeup of the county was 98.81% White, 0.13% Black or African American, 0.17% Native American, 0.13% Asian, 0.01% Pacific Islander, 0.29% from other races, and 0.47% from two or more races. 0.89% of the population were Hispanic or Latino of any race. 43.5% were of Norwegian, 24.6% German and 17.0% Polish ancestry. 94.9% spoke English, 1.6% Norwegian and 1.6% Spanish as their first language.

There were 10,747 households, out of which 31.80% had children under the age of 18 living with them, 55.20% were married couples living together, 7.40% had a female householder with no husband present, and 32.60% were non-families. 27.60% of all households were made up of individuals, and 13.50% had someone living alone who was 65 years of age or older. The average household size was 2.45 and the average family size was 3.00.

In the county, the population was spread out, with 25.30% under the age of 18, 6.90% from 18 to 24, 28.20% from 25 to 44, 23.10% from 45 to 64, and 16.40% who were 65 years of age or older. The median age was 38 years. For every 100 females there were 100.30 males. For every 100 females age 18 and over, there were 98.80 males.

In 2017, there were 450 births, giving a general fertility rate of 93.1 births per 1000 women aged 15–44, the third highest rate out of all 72 Wisconsin counties.

Gallery

Communities

Cities
 Arcadia
 Blair
 Galesville
 Independence
 Osseo
 Whitehall (county seat)

Villages
 Eleva
 Ettrick
 Pigeon Falls
 Strum
 Trempealeau

Towns

 Albion
 Arcadia
 Burnside
 Caledonia
 Chimney Rock
 Dodge
 Ettrick
 Gale
 Hale
 Lincoln
 Pigeon
 Preston
 Sumner
 Trempealeau
 Unity

Census-designated place
 Dodge

Unincorporated communities

 Beaches Corners
 Butman Corners
 Chapultepee
 Centerville
 Coral City
 Dewey Corners
 Elk Creek
 Frenchville
 Hale
 Hegg
 Iduna
 North Creek
 Pine Creek
 Pleasantville
 Russell
 Tamarack
 Upper French Creek
 West Prairie
 Wrights Corners

Ghost towns/neighborhoods
 Cortland
 New City
 Williamsburg

Politics

See also
 National Register of Historic Places listings in Trempealeau County, Wisconsin

References

Further reading
 Biographical History of La Crosse, Trempealeau and Buffalo Counties, Wisconsin.. Chicago: Lewis Publishing, 1892.
 Curtiss-Wedge, Franklyn (comp.). History of Trempealeau County, Wisconsin. Chicago: H. C. Cooper, Jr. 1917.

External links
 Trempealeau County
 Trempealeau County map from the Wisconsin Department of Transportation
 Trempealeau County Health and Demographic Data

 
1855 establishments in Wisconsin
Populated places established in 1855
Wisconsin counties on the Mississippi River